Peter Edward Berger (May 30, 1944 – September 22, 2011) was an American film editor with about fifty feature and television film credits. He is known for editing films such as Mommie Dearest (1981), four films in the Star Trek series (from Star Trek IV: The Voyage Home (1986) through Star Trek: Insurrection (1998)), Fatal Attraction (1987), and  Coach Carter (2005). His last credit was for the television biopic Gifted Hands: The Ben Carson Story (2009). It was his sixth collaboration with director Thomas Carter. With Michael Kahn, Berger won the 1989 BAFTA Award for Best Editing for Fatal Attraction, and they were nominated for the Academy Award and the American Cinema Editors Eddie for the film.

Berger was the son of film editor Fred W. Berger. He attended film school at the University of California, Los Angeles (UCLA), served in the United States Army, and worked for the Armed Forces Korean Network in Seoul. He began his career in 1968 working on the television program, The Doris Day Show. His first credit was for the feature film Arnold (1973).

Filmography
As editor
 The Savage Is Loose (1974)
 Hot Potato (1976)
 It's Showtime (1976)
 The Skatebirds (1977, TV series)
 The Pack (1977)
 Kiss Meets the Phantom of the Park (1978, TV)
 The Promise (1979)
 Oh, God! Book II (1980)
 The Last Married Couple in America (1980)
 Mommie Dearest (1981)
 First Monday in October (1981)
 Monsignor (1982)
 Hobson's Choice (1983) (TV)
 Staying Alive (1983)
 The Face of Rage (1983, TV)
 Burning Rage (1984, TV)
 Silence of the Heart (1984, TV)
 Call to Glory (1984, TV series)
 Heart of a Champion: The Ray Mancini Story (1985, TV)
 Scandal Sheet (1985, TV)
 Star Trek IV: The Voyage Home (1986)
 Fire with Fire (1986)
 Less than Zero (1987)
 Fatal Attraction (1987)
 The Good Mother (1988)
 Memories of Me (1988)
 Do You Know the Muffin Man? (1989, TV)
 Star Trek V: The Final Frontier (1989)
 Funny About Love (1990)
 Dead Again (1991)
 All I Want for Christmas (1991)
 The Magical World of Chuck Jones (1992)
 Stay Tuned (1992)
 Hocus Pocus (1993)
 Holy Matrimony (1994)
 Star Trek Generations (1994)
 Homeward Bound II: Lost in San Francisco (1996)
 Lawnmower Man 2: Beyond Cyberspace (1996, uncredited)
 Red Corner (1997)
 Metro (1997)
 Star Trek: Insurrection (1998)
 Lover's Prayer (2001)
 Save the Last Dance (2001)
 Like Mike (2002)
 Clockstoppers (2002)
 Garfield: The Movie (2004)
 Coach Carter (2005)
 Alvin and the Chipmunks (2007)
 88 Minutes (2008)
 Gifted Hands: The Ben Carson Story (2009, TV)

As additional editor
 Vision Quest (1985)
 Internal Affairs (1990)

As assistant editor
 Arnold (1973)
 The Devil's Rain (1975)

References

External links
 

1944 births
2011 deaths
American Cinema Editors
American film editors
Best Editing BAFTA Award winners
Film people from Los Angeles
Daughter